Robert Allison Fetzer (September 9, 1887 – May 19, 1968) was an American football coach, track and field coach, and college athletics administrator.  He served as the head football coach at Davidson College in 1914 and as co-head football coach at the University of North Carolina at Chapel Hill with his brother, Bill, from 1921 to 1925, compiling a career college football record of 35–13–5.  Fetzer was also the head track coach at North Carolina from 1921 to 1952 and the school's athletic director from 1923 to 1952. He was later the executive secretary of the Morehead Foundation at North Carolina.  Fetzer died on May 19, 1968, in Chapel Hill, North Carolina.

Head coaching record

Football

References

External links
 

1887 births
1968 deaths
Davidson Wildcats football coaches
North Carolina Tar Heels athletic directors
North Carolina Tar Heels football coaches
North Carolina Tar Heels track and field coaches
People from Cabarrus County, North Carolina